ASUW may refer to:
Associated Students of the University of Washington
Associated Students of the University of Wyoming
Anti-surface warfare (ASuW)